Ambassador Hotel Kaohsiung (Chinese：高雄國賓大飯店) is a  tall five star hotel located on Minsheng 2nd Road, Qianjin District, Kaohsiung, Taiwan, which opened in 1981.

Facilities
The hotel has 453 guest rooms, and 24 floors. The hotel is operated by The Ambassador Hotel Co., Ltd. and offers free wifi, a swimming pool as well as free parking.

The hotel has spacious rooms, each room is equipped with air conditioning, minibar, desk, movies on demand, satellite/cable TV, LCD TV/plasma TV, TV, in-room safe, refrigerator, separate shower and bathtub, shower facilities, hair dryer, tea/coffee Maker, daily newspaper, complimentary bottled water, bathrobes, and WiFi.

The hotel has a variety of room types to choose from, including the Ambassador Suite, Superior Queen Room, Superior Queen Room with Harbour View, Superior Sea View Twin Room, Superior Twin Room, Deluxe King Room.

Restaurants & Bars
 iRiver: Buffet restaurant serving a wide variety of both international and local flavors, featuring a spinning salad bar and meat carvery.
 Canton Court: Chinese restaurant featuring traditional Cantonese cuisine, with dim sum and fresh seafood.
 Szechuan Court: Chinese restaurant providing traditional Sichuan cuisine located on the 20th floor overlooking the skyline of Kaohsiung. 
 Sky Lounge: Lounge located on the 20th floor with views of the Love River as well as Port of Kaohsiung.
 Sail Lounge: Lounge located on the pool deck on the first floor.
 Corner Bakery 63: Bakery offering fresh pastries, including Taiwanese pineapple cake.

See also
 Ambassador Hotel Hsinchu

References

External links
Official website

1981 establishments in Taiwan
Hotels in Kaohsiung
Hotels established in 1981
Hotel buildings completed in 1981